Onasemnogene abeparvovec, sold under the brand name Zolgensma, is a gene therapy medication used to treat spinal muscular atrophy (SMA). It is used as a one-time infusion into a vein.

Onasemnogene abeparvovec works by providing a new copy of the gene that makes the human SMN protein.

The treatment must be accompanied by a course of corticosteroids of at least two months. Common side effects include vomiting and increased liver enzymes.

Onasemnogene abeparvovec was first approved for medical use in the United States in 2019 as a treatment for children less than two years old. It was later approved in other jurisdictions with similar scope. The approval scope in certain jurisdictions, including the European Union and Canada, is somewhat different.

With an introductory price of $2.125 million per treatment, onasemnogene abeparvovec is one of the most expensive drugs in the world.

Medical uses
Onasemnogene abeparvovec has been developed to treat spinal muscular atrophy, a disease linked to a mutation in the SMN1 gene on chromosome 5q and diagnosed predominantly in young children that causes progressive loss of muscle function and frequently death. The medication is administered as an intravenous infusion.

The treatment is approved in the United States and certain other countries for use in children with spinal muscular atrophy up to the age of two, including at the presymptomatic stage of the disease. In the European Union and Canada, it is indicated for the treatment of patients with spinal muscular atrophy who either have a clinical diagnosis of spinal muscular atrophy type 1 or have up to three copies of the SMN2 gene.

The medication is used with corticosteroids in an effort to protect the liver.

Adverse effects
Common adverse reactions may include nausea and elevated liver enzymes. Serious adverse reactions may include liver problems and low platelets. Transient elevated levels of cardiac troponin‑I were observed in clinical trials; the clinical importance of these findings is not known. However, cardiac toxicity was seen in studies of other animals.

As the medication may reduce the platelet count, platelets may need to be checked before the medication is started, then weekly for the first month and every two weeks for the next two months until the level is back to baseline. Liver function should be monitored for three months after administration.

Mechanism of action
SMA is a neuromuscular disorder caused by a mutation in the SMN1 gene, which leads to a decrease in SMN protein, a protein necessary for survival of motor neurons. Onasemnogene abeparvovec is a biologic drug consisting of AAV9 virus capsids that contains a SMN1 transgene along with synthetic promoters. Upon administration, the AAV9 viral vector delivers the SMN1 transgene to the affected motor neurons, where it leads to an increase in SMN protein.

History
Onasemnogene abeparvovec was developed by the US biotechnology startup AveXis, which was acquired by Novartis in 2018, based on the work at the Institut de Myologie in France.

The U.S. Food and Drug Administration (FDA) granted the application for onasemnogene abeparvovec-xioi fast track, breakthrough therapy, priority review, and orphan drug designations. The FDA also awarded the manufacturer a rare pediatric disease priority review voucher, and granted the approval of Zolgensma to AveXis Inc.

In June 2015, the European Commission granted orphan designation for the drug. In July 2019, the drug was removed from the Committee for Medicinal Products for Human Use (CHMP) accelerated assessment program.

In May 2019, onasemnogene abeparvovec received US FDA approval as a treatment for children less than two years old. Since 2019, the treatment has been reimbursed in Israel and Qatar. In March 2020, onasemnogene abeparvovec was granted regulatory approval in Japan with the label identical to the US one. Also in March 2020, the European Medicines Agency recommended a conditional marketing authorization for use in people with SMA type 1 or with any SMA type and having no more than three copies of the SMN2 gene. In May 2020, Onasemnogene abeparvovec was conditionally approved in Europe.

In August 2020, onasemnogene abeparvovec was granted regulatory approval in Brazil by the Brazilian Health Regulatory Agency (ANVISA).

In December 2020, onasemnogene abeparvovec was approved for medical use in Canada.

Onasemnogene abeparvovec was approved for medical use in Australia in February 2021.

An official approval in Russia was granted in December 2021.

Society and culture

Economics 
In its first full quarter of sales  of medication was sold.

In Japan, the drug was made available through the public health care system on 20 May 2020, making it the most expensive drug covered by the Japanese public health care system. USD ) per patient.

Controversy 
In the months leading up to the medication's approval by the US Food and Drug Administration (FDA), a whistleblower informed Novartis that certain studies of the medication had been subject to data manipulation. Novartis fired two AveXis executives it determined responsible for the alleged data manipulation but informed the FDA of the data integrity issue only in June 2019, a month after the drug's approval. The delay drew strong condemnation from the FDA. In October 2019, the company admitted to not having informed the FDA and the European Medicines Agency (EMA) for seven months about toxic effects of the intravenous formulation observed in laboratory animals. Due to data manipulation issue, the EMA withdrew their decision to allow an accelerated assessment of the medication.

In December 2019, Novartis announced that it would donate 100 doses of onasemnogene abeparvovec per year to children outside the US through a global lottery. The decision, which has been claimed by Novartis to be based on a recommendation by unnamed bioethicists, was received with much criticism by the European Commission, some European healthcare regulators and patient groups who see it as emotionally burdening, suboptimal, and ethically questionable. Novartis did not consult with families or doctors before announcing the scheme.

Names 
Onasemnogene abeparvovec is the international nonproprietary name (INN) and the United States Adopted Name (USAN).

References

External links 
 

Breakthrough therapy
Drug discovery
Drugs that are a gene therapy
Experimental drugs
Gene therapy
Novartis brands
Orphan drugs
Spinal muscular atrophy